Private Karlsson on Leave (Swedish: 91:an Karlssons permis) is a 1947 Swedish comedy film directed by Gösta Bernhard and Hugo Bolander and starring Gus Dahlström, Holger Höglund and Fritiof Billquist. It was shot at the Imagoateljéerna Studios in the Stockholm suburb of Stocksund. The film's sets were designed by the art director Arne Åkermark. It was one of eight films in a series featuring the military conscript Mandel Karlsson based on the an comic strip.

Cast
 Gus Dahlström as 	91:an 'Mandel' Karlsson
 Holger Höglund as 	87:an Axelsson
 Fritiof Billquist as 	Korpral Revär
 Irene Söderblom as 	Elvira
 John Norrman as 	Överste Gyllenskalp
 Douglas Håge as 	Major Morgonkröök
 Julia Cæsar as Fru Morgonkröök
 Thor Modéen as 	Major 'Jokern' Lejon
 Eric Gustafson as 	Johansson 
 Stig Johanson as 	Svensson 
 Gunnel Wadner as Greta

References

Bibliography 
 Sundholm, John . Historical Dictionary of Scandinavian Cinema. Scarecrow Press, 2012.

External links 
 

1947 films
Swedish comedy films
1947 comedy films
1940s Swedish-language films
Films directed by Gösta Bernhard
Films directed by Hugo Bolander
1940s Swedish films
Films based on Swedish comics
Live-action films based on comics